SS Wardha was a 3,917-ton steamship built for the British-India Steam Navigation Company in 1887 by Alexander Stephen and Sons, Glasgow.

She was used for the transportation of Indian indentured labourers to the colonies. Details of some of these voyages are as follows:

In 1912, Wardha was sold to F. Bruzzo of Italy.

See also 
 Indian Indenture Ships to Fiji

References

External links 
 
 

Ships of the British India Steam Navigation Company
History of Guyana
Indian indenture ships to Fiji
Victorian-era passenger ships of the United Kingdom
Ships built on the River Clyde
1887 ships